Charles Terres Weymann (2 August 1889 – 1976) was a Haitian-born early aeroplane racing pilot and businessman. During World War I he flew for Nieuport as a test pilot and was awarded the rank of Chevalier of the Legion of Honour.

Early years
Weymann was born in Port-au-Prince, Haiti, on 2 August 1889 of an American father and Haitian mother. It has been suggested that his mother and US-born father were on a liner in Haitian waters at the time of his birth. He spoke fluent English and French and seems to have had dual US & French nationality but resided permanently in France. He died in France in 1976.

Inventor

Fabric bodies
After the war Charles Weymann used his knowledge of airframe manufacture to develop a system of making fabric bodies for road vehicles. He opened factories in Paris in 1921, London in 1923 and Indianapolis in 1928. The market for these grew enormously and Weymann licensed his system to many of Europe's most prestigious marques.

A change of fashion in the late 1920s led to a demand for gloss painted bodies and the fabric market disappeared. A system was developed using metal panels with a similar flexible mounting allowing movement between panels. It was used on coachbuilt bodies but it did not suit the demands of mass-production.

The French factory closed in 1930 followed by Indianapolis in 1931. The British plant had turned to the manufacture of bus bodies and survived (as Metro Cammell Weymann) but Weymann resigned from the company in 1932.

Automatic clutch
He maintained his interest in developing equipment for the automotive industry. In 1963 he obtained a patent for an automatic clutch but it did not meet with commercial success.

Weymann returned to aviation with the engineer Georges Lepère and continued to design aircraft, such as the Weymann 66 and autogyros at Société des Avions C T Weymann.

Aviation achievements
He held American Aero Club pilot's license number 24, granted in 1909.
In August 1910, he participated in the French Circuit de l'Est air competition.
In September 1910, he attempted to win the Michelin prize by flying from Paris to Puy de Dôme (about 250 miles) with a passenger in six hours. After seven hours he set down about 10 km short of his destination, bad weather preventing further progress.
In June 1911, he took part in the Paris-Rome air race.
In July 1911, he took part in the Circuit d'Europé, but retired to compete in the Gordon Bennett Trophy race.
In July 1911 he represented the US in the 3rd Gordon Bennett Trophy race at the Royal Aero Club's flying field at Eastchurch, England winning the race flying a 100 hp Gnome-engined Nieuport monoplane over the 25 six-km laps at an average speed of 78.1 mph (125.663 km/h).
In November 1911 he flew the winning aircraft in the French Army's Reims Military Aviation Competition, 1911.
He participated in the 1912 Hydroplane contest at Monaco, St-Malo (both France) and the Temse 1912 Hydroplane contests in Belgium.
In 1913 he competed for France in the Schneider Trophy race at Monaco but was forced out by engine failure when in the lead.

Motor racing

Weymann brought a Stutz DV16 Blackhawk team to Le Mans 1928 and they finished second in the race – to a Bentley.

Notes

References

External links
Photograph of Weymann in 1911
A Page dedicated to Charles Weymann

1889 births
1976 deaths
Aviation pioneers
French aviators
Haitian aviators
American aviators
Haitian emigrants to France
French people of American descent
French automobile designers
Chevaliers of the Légion d'honneur
French automotive pioneers